Nisa Retail Limited (formerly Nisa-Today's and Northern Independent Supermarkets Association) is a brand and groceries wholesaler (or "symbol group") operating in the United Kingdom. It is a wholly owned subsidiary of the Co-operative Group Limited. It was formerly a mutual organisation owned by its members and operating "...like a co-operative, using the collective buying power of the large group of members to negotiate deals with suppliers".

History

Nisa was founded as the Northern Independent Supermarkets Association by Peter Garvin and Dudley B. Ramsden in 1977.

In 2011, Nisa-Today's demerged into Nisa and Today's Group. Today's Group subsequently merged with Landmark Wholesale in 2018 to form Unitas Wholesale.

In 2011, Nisa Retail Limited opened its new distribution centre for Scotland in Livingston.

Nisa agreed to be purchased by the Co-operative Group in November 2017. The acquisition was subject to regulatory approval by the Competition and Markets Authority, and was completed in May 2018. In 2019, Nisa recruited more than 500 stores, representing a 40% increase in the number of outlets being signed.

Operations

Nisa's headquarters and one of its ambient distribution centres are co-located in Scunthorpe, North Lincolnshire. It also has distribution centres for temperature controlled products at Stoke-on-Trent, Staffordshire; Harlow, Essex and Livingston, West Lothian.

, some stores are branded under the LoCo fascia.

, Nisa Retail Limited supplies over 4,000 convenience shops and small supermarkets, including the Costcutter symbol group and CK Foodstores in Wales. According to Company Accounts submitted for year ending on 31 March 2014, Nisa Retail Limited has an estimated net worth of £30.77 million.

See also
International Trade Awards (2007)

References

External links

 Nisa Retail Limited's website

Convenience stores of the United Kingdom
British companies established in 1977
Retail companies established in 1977
Retailers' cooperatives
Companies based in Scunthorpe
1977 establishments in the United Kingdom